Zoroga is a village in Central District of Botswana. It is located 40 km west of Nata, along the Nata–Maun road. The village has a primary school and the population was 948 in 2001 census.

References

Populated places in Central District (Botswana)
Villages in Botswana